This is a simple list of the butterflies of Morocco. It does not include the rank changes or subspecies recognized by Tennent (1996) or Delacre and Tarrier (2008).

The list includes the Spanish controlled areas of Ceuta, Melilla and Plazas de soberanía, as well as the territory of the disputed state Sahrawi Arab Democratic Republic.

Hesperiidae 
Large grizzled skipper, Pyrgus alveus (Hübner, 1803)
Oberthür's grizzled skipper, Pyrgus armoricanus (Oberthür, 1910)
Rosy grizzled skipper, Pyrgus onopordi Rambur, 1839
Red-underwing skipper, Spialia sertorius Hoffmannsegg, 1804
Desert grizzled skipper, Spialia doris (Walker, 1870)
Sage skipper, Muschampia proto Ochsenheimer, 1808
Barbary skipper, Syrichtus mohammed Oberthür, 1887
Syrichtus leuzae Oberthür, 1881
False mallow skipper, Carcharodus tripolina Verity, 1925
Marbled skipper, Carcharodus lavatherae Esper, 1783
Carcharodus floccifera (Zeller, 1847).
Stauder's skipper, Carcharodus stauderi Reverdin, 1913
Tufted skipper, Thymelicus acteon (Rottemburg, 1775)
Moroccan small skipper, Thymelicus hamza Oberthür 1876
Essex skipper, Thymelicus lineola (Ochsenheimer, 1808)
Small skipper, Thymelicus sylvestris (Poda, 1761)
Silver-spotted skipper, Hesperia comma (Linnaeus, 1758)
Mediterranean skipper, Gegenes nostrodamus Fabricius, 1794
Pigmy skipper, Gegenes pumilio Hoffmannsegg, 1804
Zeller's skipper, Borbo borbonica Boisduval, 1833

Papilionidae

Papilioninae
Spanish festoon, Zerynthia rumina (Linnaeus, 1758)
Scarce swallowtail, Iphiclides feisthamelii (Duponchel, 1832) 
Old World swallowtail, Papilio machaon Linnaeus, 1758
Sahara swallowtail, Papilio saharae Oberthür, 1879

Pieridae

Pierinae
Black-veined white, Aporia crataegi (Linnaeus 1758)
Large white, Pieris brassicae (Linnaeus, 1758) 
Small white, Pieris rapae (Linnaeus, 1758)
Southern small white, Pieris mannii (Mayer, 1851)
Green-veined white, Pieris napi (Linnaeus, 1758)
Bath white, Pontia daplidice (Linnaeus, 1908) 
Desert white, Pontia glauconome (Klug, 1829) 
Eastern dappled white, Euchloe ausonia (Hübner, [1803-1804])
Portuguese dappled white, Euchloe tagis (Hübner, [1803-1804])
Green-striped white, Euchloe belemia (Esper, 1800)
Scarce green striped white, Euchloe falloui (Allard, 1867) 
Greenish black-tip, Euchloe charlonia (Donzel, 1842) 
Sooty orange tip, Zegris eupheme Esper, 1805
Morocco orange tip, Anthocharis belia (Linnaeus, 1767) 
Colotis evagore Klug, 1829
Golden Arab, Colotis chrysonome (Klug, 1829)

Coliadinae
African migrant, Catopsilia florella (Fabricius, 1775) 
Dark clouded yellow, Colias croceus (Geoffroy in Fourcroy, 1785) 
Berger's clouded yellow, Colias alfacariensis Ribbe, 1905 
Common brimstone, Gonepteryx rhamni (Linnaeus, 1758)
Cleopatra, Gonepteryx cleopatra (Linnaeus, 1767)

Dismorphiinae
Wood white, Leptidea sinapis (Linnaeus, 1758)

Lycaenidae

Theclinae
Donzel's silver-line, Cigaritis zohra Donzel, 1847
Allard's silver lines, Cigaritis allardi Oberthür 1909
Purple hairstreak, Neozephyrus quercus (Linnaeus 1758)
False ilex hairstreak, Satyrium esculi (Hübner, 1804)
Green hairstreak, Callophrys rubi (Linnaeus, 1758)
Chapman's green hairstreak, Callophrys avis Chapman, 1909
Provence hairstreak, Tomares ballus (Fabricius, 1787) 
Moroccan hairstreak, Tomares mauretanicus (Lucas, 1849)

Lycaeninae
Small copper, Lycaena phlaeas (Linnaeus, 1761) 
Purple-shot copper, Lycaena alciphron (Rottemburg, 1775)
 Lycaena phoebus (Blachier, 1905)

Polyommatinae
Long-tailed blue, Lampides boeticus (Linnaeus, 1767) 
Common zebra blue, Leptotes pirithous (Linnaeus, 1767) 
Geranium bronze, Cacyreus marshalli Butler, 1898 
Pointed Pierrot, Tarucus theophrastus (Fabricius, 1793) 
Tarucus rosacea (Austaut, 1885) 
African babul blue, Azanus jesous (Guérin-Méneville, 1849) 
Bright babul blue, Azanus ubaldus (Stoll, 1782) 
African grass blue, Zizeeria knysna (Trimen, 1862) 
Lorquin's blue, Cupido lorquinii (Herrich-Schäffer, 1851) 
Holly blue, Celastrina argiolus (Linnaeus, 1758)
Black-eyed blue, Glaucopsyche melanops (Boisduval, 1828).
Iolas blue, Iolana iolas (Ochsenheimer, 1816) 
False baton blue, Pseudophilotes abencerragus (Pierret, 1837) 
Panoptes blue, Pseudophilotes panoptes (Hübner, [1813])
Bavius blue, Pseudophilotes bavius (Eversmann, 1832)
Brown argus, Aricia agestis (Denis & Schiffermüller, 1775)
Northern brown argus, Aricia artaxerxes (Fabricius, 1775)
Vogel's blue, Maurus vogelii (Oberthür, 1920)
Kretania allardii (Oberthür, 1874)
Martin's blue, Kretania martini (Allard, 1867)
Mazarine blue, Cyaniris semiargus (Rottemburg, 1775).
Common blue, Polyommatus icarus (Rottemburg, 1775)
Escher's blue, Polyommatus escheri Hübner, 1823
Amanda's blue, Polyommatus amanda Schneider, 1792
Chapman's blue, Polyommatus thersites (Cantener, 1835) 
Atlas blue, Polyommatus atlantica (Elwes, 1905) 
Spanish chalk-hill blue, Lysandra albicans (Gerhard, 1851)
Chalkhill blue, Lysandra coridon (Poda, 1761)
Spotted Adonis blue, Lysandra punctifera (Oberthür, 1876) 
Adonis blue, Lysandra bellargus (Rottemburg, 1775)

Nymphalidae

Danainae
Monarch, Danaus plexippus (Linnaeus, 1758) 
Danaus chrysippus (Linnaeus, 1758)

Charaxinae
Two-tailed pasha, Charaxes jasius (Linnaeus, 1767)

Nymphalinae
Blackleg tortoiseshell, Nymphalis polychloros (Linnaeus, 1758)
Red admiral, Vanessa atalanta (Linnaeus, 1758) 
Painted lady, Vanessa cardui (Linnaeus, 1758) 
Comma, Polygonia c-album (Linnaeus, 1758)
Glanville fritillary, Melitaea cinxia (Linnaeus, 1758)
Knapweed fritillary, Melitaea phoebe (Denis & Schiffermüller, 1775)
Aetherie fritillary, Melitaea aetherie (Hübner, 1826) 
Spotted fritillary, Melitaea didyma (Esper, 1778) 
Desert fritillary, Melitaea deserticola (Oberthür, 1876)
Provençal fritillary, Melitaea deione (Geyer, 1832) 
Marsh fritillary, Euphydryas aurinia (Rottemburg, 1775) 
Spanish fritillary, Euphydryas desfontainii (Godart, 1819)

Heliconiinae
Cardinal, Argynnis pandora (Denis & Schiffermüller, 1775) 
Dark green fritillary, Speyeria aglaja (Linnaeus, 1758)
Moroccan high brown fritillary, Fabriciana auresiana (Fruhstorfer, 1908) 
Queen of Spain fritillary, Issoria lathonia (Linnaeus, 1758) 
Violet fritillary, Boloria dia (Linnaeus, 1767)

Satyrinae
Western marbled white, Melanargia occitanica Esper, 1793
Spanish marbled white, Melanargia ines (Hoffmannsegg, 1804)
Tree grayling, Hipparchia statilinus Hufnagel, 1766
Austaut's grayling, Hipparchia hansii (Austaut, 1879)
Powell's grayling, Hipparchia powelli (Oberthür, 1910) 
Striped grayling, Hipparchia fidia Linnaeus, 1767
Hermit, Chazara briseis Linnaeus, 1764
Southern hermit, Chazara prieuri (Pierret, 1837)
Moroccan grayling, Pseudochazara atlantis (Austaut, 1905) 
Great sooty satyr, Satyrus ferula (Fabricius, 1793)
Giant grayling, Berberia abdelkader (Pierret, 1837) 
dark giant grayling, Berberia lambessanus (Staudinger, 1901) 
Meadow brown, Maniola jurtina (Linnaeus, 1758) 
Moroccan meadow brown, Hyponephele maroccana (Blachier, 1908) 
Oriental meadow brown, Hyponephele lupinus (Costa, 1836)
Gatekeeper, Pyronia tithonus (Linnaeus, 1758)
Southern gatekeeper, Pyronia cecilia (Vallantin, 1894) 
Spanish gatekeeper, Pyronia bathseba (Fabricius, 1793) 
Coenonympha lyllus (Esper, 1806) 
Dusky heath, Coenonympha dorus Esper, 1782
Moroccan dusky heath, Coenonympha fettigii Oberthür, 1874 
Coenonympha vaucheri Blachier 1905 
Moroccan pearly heath, Coenonympha arcanioides (Pierret, 1837) 
Speckled wood, Pararge aegeria (Linnaeus, 1758) 
Wall brown, Lasiommata megera (Linnaeus, 1767)
Large wall brown, Lasiommata maera (Linnaeus, 1758)

See also
List of ecoregions in Morocco

References

Charles Oberthür and Harold Powell, 1914 Faune des Lepidopteres de la Barbarie. Etudes de Lepidopterologie comparee, part 10, p. 1-459. Rennes, 1914. text online plates online
Supplemental notes to Mr. Charles Oberthur's Faune des Lepidopteres de la Barbarie, with lists of the specimens in the Tring Museum Novitates Zoologicae Tring 27: 1-127 (1920).online
 Tennent, J., 1996 The Butterflies of Morocco, Algeria and Tunisia Gem Publishing Co 
 Delacre, J. and Tarrier, M. 2008 Les Papillons de Jour du Maroc Un Guide d'Identification et de Bioindication  
 Tarrier and Delacre 
 Tarrier and Delacre
 Funet

Morocco

Morocco
Butterflies